The Invisible Killer is a 1939 American mystery film directed by Sam Newfield and starring Grace Bradley, Roland Drew and William Newell. It was one of the earliest films made by Producers Releasing Corporation, a low-budget outfit concentrating on second features.

Synopsis
A racketeer offers to inform to the district attorney about the ringleaders of a gambling syndicate but is murdered before he can do so before by a seeming "invisible killer". Newspaper reporter Sue Walker and her policeman fiancée Jerry Brown take up the investigation.

Cast
 Grace Bradley as Sue Walker
 Roland Drew as Lt. Jerry Brown
 William Newell as 	Det. Sgt. Pat Dugan
 Alex Callam as Arthur Enslee
 Frank Coletti as 	Vani Martin
 Sidney Grayler as 	Lefty Ross
 Crane Whitley as Dist. Atty. Richard Sutton 
 Boyd Irwin as 	Mr. Cunningham
 Jean Brooks as 	Gloria Cunningham 
 David Oliver as 	Llewellyln Worcester, Sutton's Valet
 Harry Woth as Tyler, Sutton's Secretary
 Ernie Adams as Squint, the Croupier
 Kernan Cripps as 	Plainclothesman 
 John Elliott as Gambler 
 Al Ferguson as 	Detective Guarding Tyler 
 Larry Steers as 	Sue's Boss

References

Bibliography
 Gates, Phillipa. Detecting Women: Gender and the Hollywood Detective Film. SUNY Press, 2011.

External links
 

1939 films
1939 mystery films
American mystery films
Films directed by Sam Newfield
American black-and-white films
Producers Releasing Corporation films
1930s English-language films
1930s American films